El accidente is a Spanish drama television series created by Daniel Écija and Inés París that premiered on Telecinco on 28 November 2017, and concluded on 20 February 2018. The series was produced by Telecinco and co-produced by Globomedia and Good Mood and was based on the Turkish drama Son also known as The End. The series consisted of a total of 13 episodes. It stars Inma Cuesta as Lucía, and Quim Gutiérrez as José as main characters.

Plot 
The series begins with a tragic airplane crash with no survivors. Certain that her husband José (Quim Gutiérrez) was on the plane, Lucía (Inma Cuesta) drives to the airport. However, there is no trace of him on the list of passengers or among the deceased, and Lucía is assaulted by doubts. Tireless, she will pull a thread that will lead her to discover that, perhaps, she did not really know the man she loves.

Cast 
 Inma Cuesta as Lucía
 Quim Gutiérrez as José Espada
 Eusebio Poncela as João Ferreira
 Berta Vázquez as María
  as Manuel
 Alain Hernández as Juan Espada
  as Ramón
 César Mateo as Nacho
  as Julián

Episodes

Ratings 
 
}}

References

External links 
 

Telecinco network series
Spanish-language television shows
2017 Spanish television series debuts
2018 Spanish television series endings
2010s Spanish drama television series
Non-Turkish television series based on Turkish television series
Spanish television series based on non-Spanish television series
Television series by Globomedia
Television series by Good Mood